The following is a chronological list of productions staged at the Derby Playhouse from 1975 to 2008. The Derby Playhouse was a theatre production company and the former name of the theatre which it owned and operated from its opening in 1975 until 2008, when the company ceased operating after a period in administration. Situated in Derby, England, the theatre is now known as the Derby Theatre and has been owned and operated by the University of Derby since 2009.

List of past productions 1975–2008

The list includes all Main House, in-house professional productions. It does not include many Studio, Theatre in Education (TIE), visiting professional or amateur performances, such as those of the Derby Gilbert & Sullivan Company, whose annual Gilbert and Sullivan shows played at the theatre from 1980 to 2003 and again after the theatre's reopening in 2009.

1970s

1975
My Fair Lady
Hamlet
Lloyd George Knew My Father
Sleeping Beauty

1976
Rosencrantz and Guildenstern Are Dead
A View from the Bridge
Cowardy Custard
An Ideal Husband
The Seagull starring Alan Bates
The Norman Conquests
The Miser
Enter Sherlock Holmes
Jack and the Beanstalk

1977
Sleuth
Macbeth
A Taste of Honey
The Importance of Being Earnest
A Man for All Seasons
Absurd Person Singular
Joseph and the Amazing Technicolor Dreamcoat
Equus
Mother Goose

1978
Romeo and Juliet
Private Lives
Irma La Douce
Hedda Gabler
Witness for the Prosecution
Mrs. Warren's Profession
Godspell
Journey's End
Dick Whittington

1979
What the Butler Saw
Murderer
Bedroom Farce
Donkeys' Years
In Praise of Love
Otherwise Engaged
Ten Times Table
King Lear
Privates on Parade
Aladdin

1980s

1980
An Inspector Calls
Count Dracula
Loot (play)
Blithe Spirit
The School for Scandal
Whose Life Is It Anyway?
Murder with Love
Rookery Nook
Pygmalion
Clouds
Relatively Speaking
Cinderella

1981
Funny Peculiar
Night and Day
Fallen Angels
The Case of the Oily Levantine
Habeas Corpus
Sisterly Feelings
All My Sons
The Conspirator
No More Sitting on the Old School Bench
The Wizard of Oz
The Adult Panto – Studio

1982
Dr Jekyll and Mr Hyde
Once a Catholic
Piaf
See How They Run
When can I have a Banana Again – Studio
Happy as a Sandbag
The Hitch-Hiker's Guide to the Galaxy
Operation Bad Apple
Middle Age Spread
The Gingerbread Man
Dry Rot

1983
Having a Ball!
The Resistible Rise of Arturo Ui
Play It Again, Sam
The Elephant Man
Present Laughter
Having a Ball!
Educating Rita
Julius Caesar
Taking Steps
Pinocchio
The Ghost Train

1984
Dirty Linen and Newfoundland
The Country Wife
Stags and Hens
Terra Nova
French Without Tears
Deathtrap
Trafford Tanzi
Love Bites
Season's Greetings
The Meg and Mog Show
Charley's Aunt

1985
Breezeblock Park
The Caucasian Chalk Circle
The Canterbury Tales
Blood Relations
You Never Can Tell
Season's Greetings
Blood Brothers
Over the Bar
Steaming
The Snow Queen

1986
The Anastasia File
Intimate Exchanges :- Affairs in a Tent & A One Man Protest
Sons of the Beach
Intimate Exchanges :- A Pageant & A Game of Golf
Tom Jones
The Brewery Beano
It's a Madhouse
Charlie and the Chocolate Factory

1987
Our Day Out
A Midsummer Night's Dream
Land of Hope and Gloria
Waiting for Godot – Studio
Cider with Rosie
The Innocent Mistress
The Children's Hour
Gaslight
The Scatterbrained Scarecrow of Oz

1988
Masterpieces
A Doll's House
The Dark at the Top of the Stairs
Sunday's Children
Time and the Conways
Private Lives
Germinal
The Queen of Spades
Hansel and Gretel

1989
Entertaining Mr Sloane
Love Games
Touched
Noises Off
The Piggy Bank
Wicked Old Nellie by Lucy Gannon (Studio and tour)
Heartbreak House
The Art of Success
Arsenic and Old Lace
Robin Hood

1990s

1990
Glory!
Selling the Sizzle
Jane Eyre
Self Portrait
The School for Wives
Tons of Money
Rebecca
Dick Whittington and His Cat

1991
Teechers
Double Double
Hobson's Choice, winner of the 1991 TMA Award for Best Overall Production.
Last of the Red Hot Lovers
84 Charing Cross Road
She Stoops to Conquer
Hard Times – Studio, Community Tour
Driving Miss Daisy
Mother Goose

1992
And a Nightingale Sang
My Sister Next Door – Studio
On the Piste
The Innocents
Far from the Madding Crowd
Blithe Spirit
Grease
Death of a Salesman
Women in Love – Studio, Community Tour
On the Piste
Aladdin

1993
Laurel and Hardy – Studio, Community Tour
A Chorus of Disapproval
Little Shop of Horrors
Frankie and Johnny in the Clair de Lune – Studio
Children of a Lesser God
Outside Edge
A Slice of Saturday Night
The Lucky Chance
Two – Studio
My Cousin Rachel
Cinderella

1994
April in Paris – Tour in Hull Truck
Les Liaisons Dangereuses
An Evening with Gary Lineker
Someone Who'll Watch Over Me – Studio
Blood Money
Passion Killers – co-production with Hull Truck
Cabaret
The Importance of Being Earnest
Ham – Studio
Absurd Person Singular
Jack and the Beanstalk

1995
Richard III
Our Boys – co-production with Incidental Theatre. Transferred to Donmar Warehouse
Oleanna
Happy Families
Assassins
Derby 100 – Derby Playhouse Community Theatre
A Passionate Woman – co-production with David Pugh Ltd. National Tour
The Woman in Black – co-production with P.W. Productions. National Tour
Comic Cuts – co-production with Triptych/Salisbury Playhouse
Richard III
Dick Whittington and His Cat

1996
Tess of the d'Urbervilles – co-production with Salisbury Playhouse
Time of My Life
My Mother Said I Never Should – Studio
The Rise and Fall of Little Voice
Extremities
Buster's Last Stand – Derby Playhouse Community Theatre
A Chorus Line
Gym and Tonic – co-production with Thorndike Theatre
Pow (play) – Studio, co-production with Paines Plough
Blood Wedding – co-production with Northern Stage
Aladdin

1997
The Rivals
Not a Game for Boys
Eleanor Rigby – Derby Playhouse Youth Theatre
Miss Julie – Studio
Adam Bede
Lips Together, Teeth Apart
By the Baseball Ground – Derby Playhouse Community Theatre
The Grapevine
'Tis Pity She's a Whore
Mr Wonderful
Three Viewings – Studio
The Subtle Art of Boiling Lobsters – Studio
Female, 29, GSOH – Studio
Price of a Good Dinner – Studio
Sleeping Beauty

1998
Taking Steps
The Oedipus Plays  – Derby Playhouse Youth Theatre
Mother Courage – co-production with Edinburgh Royal Lyceum Theatre
Lucky Sods
The Glass Menagerie
Off Yer Trolley  – Derby Playhouse Community Theatre
Blues in the Night
The Collector – co-production with Edinburgh Royal Lyceum Theatre
Anna Karenina – co-production with Shared Experience
Krapp's Last Tape – Studio, co-production with RSC
The Black Dahlia – co-production with Method and Madness
Babes in the Wood

1999
Bouncers
Twelfth Night  – co-production with Northern Broadsides
Coming of Age – Derby Playhouse Youth Theatre
Things Fall Apart – co-production with The Performance Studio Workshop of Nigeria
Boyband
The Ride Down Mt. Morgan
Und – Studio, co-production with The Wrestling School
Bouncers
The Passion Play – Derby Playhouse Community Play
Soul Train
Watching the Sand from the Sea
Masquerade – co-production with The State Small Theatre of Vilnius
Mother Goose

2000s

2000
A Clockwork Orange – co-production with Northern Stage
Animal Farm – co-production with Northern Stage
Perfect Days
Shylock – Studio, co-production with Guy Masterson Productions
Pericles – Derby Playhouse Youth Theatre
Speaking in Tongues
Perfect Pitch
No Fishing! – Derby Playhouse Community Theatre
God and Stephen Hawking
Leader of the Pack co-production with Churchill Theatre Bromley
Sparkleshark – co-production with the National Theatre
Passing Places
Cinderella

2001
Lady Day at Emerson's Bar and Grill – Studio
The Contractor – co-production with Oxford Stage Company
The Blue Room
Tales of Hans Anderson – Derby Playhouse Youth Theatre
Nineteen Eighty-Four – co-production with Northern Stage
Danny Bouncing
Ain't Misbehavin'
Lady Day at Emerson's Bar and Grill – Studio
The School for Scandal
On the Piste
Jack and the Beanstalk
A Life in the Theatre

2002
Great Expectations
Misconceptions
Class of '77 – Derby Playhouse Youth Theatre
Up 'n' Under
The Browning Version
Way Upstream
Life of Galileo – Derby Playhouse Community Theatre
Dick Whittington

2003
Educating Rita (1February1March 2003)
My Dad's Corner Shop  (22March12April 2003) by Ray Grewal (The play won Grewal the Meyer-Whitworth Award in 2001. This was its first main-stage production)
Viking Tales  (1619April 2003) – Derby Playhouse Youth Theatre
The Entertainer  (26April24May 2003)
Oh, What a Lovely War!  (31May28June 2003) – Pro & Derby Playhouse Community Theatre
Blithe Spirit (6September4October 2003)
Dracula (11October1November 2003) 
Loot (829November 2003)
A Christmas Carol (6December 200324January 2004)

2004
Shirley Valentine (31January5February 2004)  
Private Lives (6March3April 2004) 
Josefina – Derby Playhouse Youth Theatre
Sweeney Todd: The Demon Barber of Fleet Street (24April2May 2004) 
A Midsummer Night's Dream (29May3July 2004) 
Silver Ghosts & Spitfires  (710July 2004) – Derby Playhouse Community Theatre 
Amadeus (28August25September 2004) 
Frankenstein (230October 2004) 
Kafka's Dick (627November 2004) 
Merlin & The Winter King (4December 200422January 2005)

2005
Can't Pay? Won't Pay! (29January26February 2005) 
Mary Stuart (526March 2005) - with Big Picture Company 
Hooray for Hollywood (30March2April 2005) – Derby Playhouse Youth Theatre  
Company (16April21May 2005) 
Romeo and Juliet (28May2July 2005) 
Bold Nelson's Praise (69July 2005) – Derby Playhouse Community Theatre  
Arsenic and Old Lace (20August17September 2005)  
Macbeth (24September22October 2005) 
Serial Killers (29October26November 2005) 
Arabian Nights (3December 200528January 2006)

2006
Henceforward... (4February4March 2006) 
Master Class (11March8April 2006)  
Into the Woods (22April20May 2006) 
Animal Farm (27May23June 2006) – Pro & Derby Playhouse Community Theatre 
A Christmas Carol  (2December 200620January 2007)

2007
The Importance of Being Earnest (27January24February 2007) 
Johnno (331March 2007) co-production with La Boite Theatre.
Merrily We Roll Along (14April19May 2007) 
As You Like It (26May23June 2007) 
The Tempest  – Derby Playhouse Youth Theatre
Moon Landing (6September6October 2007) starring Glenn Carter (world premiere)
Stepping Out (13October17November 2007) 
Treasure Island (24November 20072February 2008)  adapted by Karen Louise Hebden from the novel by Robert Louis Stevenson

2008
The Killing of Sister George (13September11October 2008) -  starring Jenny Eclair and directed by Cal McCrystal.

References

External links
Derby Playhouse official website (no longer updated)
Past versions of the official website dating back to 2001 archived on the Wayback Machine.

Culture in Derby
History of Derby
Theatre company production histories